Pont-du-Casse is a former railway station in Pont-du-Casse, Nouvelle-Aquitaine, France. The station is located on the Niversac - Agen railway line. The station was served by TER (local) services between Agen and Périgueux. It was closed in December 2020.

References

Railway stations in France opened in 1863
Defunct railway stations in Lot-et-Garonne